Jorge de Cárdenas Plá (born January 2, 1933 in Havana, Cuba) is a Cuban former Olympic sailor. He competed in three Olympic Games in the Finn and Star classes, in 1952 he finished 24th in the Finn class, in 1956 he finished 6th in the Star class crewing for his father Carlos de Cárdenas Culmell and in 1960 he finished 13th in the Star class together with his brother Carlos de Cárdenas Plá. He also has a silver medal from the 1955 Star World Championships and a bronze medal from the 1956 edition.

References

1933 births
Living people
Sportspeople from Havana
Star class sailors
Finn class sailors
Olympic sailors of Cuba
Cuban male sailors (sport)
Sailors at the 1952 Summer Olympics – Finn
Sailors at the 1956 Summer Olympics – Star
Sailors at the 1960 Summer Olympics – Star
20th-century Cuban people